U.S. Route 19 (US 19) traverses approximately  across the Tri-Cities area of East Tennessee. The highway begins at Bluff City, where the highway splits into US 19E and US 19W, which both head into North Carolina and rejoin to form US 19 in North Carolina. US 19's Tennessee portion ends at the Virginia state line at the twin cities of Bristol, Tennessee, and Bristol, Virginia.

Route description
US 19 is formed at Bluff City by the confluence of US 19E and US 19W. US 19E heads southeast toward Elizabethton and US 19W continues southwest concurrent with US 11E toward Johnson City. US 19 heads north concurrent with US 11E along Volunteer Parkway across the South Fork Holston River. The U.S. Highways have a diamond interchange with SR 394 just west of the state highway's junction with SR 390 (Bluff City Highway).  The U.S. Highways cross Beaver Creek adjacent to Bristol Motor Speedway and follow the stream's valley between the Whitetop Knobs to the east and the Beaver Creek Knobs to the west.  US 11E and US 19 enter the city of Bristol. Three blocks south of the state line, the highways meet US 421 (Anderson Street). SR 34 breaks from its unsigned concurrency with US 11E and US 19 and heads east on US 421 toward Mountain City. The intersection forms the eastern terminus of SR 1. SR 1 joins the three U.S. Highways for three blocks to State Street, which follows the Tennessee–Virginia state line and serves as the main street of both cities of Bristol. SR 1 turns west along State Street while the three U.S. Highways continue into Bristol, Virginia.

Alternate names
Though the highway is commonly known as "US 19" throughout the state, the highway does have other known names it uses locally in areas.
Volunteer Parkway - Road name from Virginia state line to Bluff City.

History
US 19 first appears in Tennessee in 1927, from the North Carolina state line (near Elk Park) to Bluff City.  Later in the same year, it was extended through Bristol, into Virginia.  In 1930, US 19 was truncated at Bluff City, splitting into US 19E along the original route into North Carolina and US 19W going towards Johnson City and then on into North Carolina.

Junction list

References

External links

 

19
 Tennessee
Transportation in Sullivan County, Tennessee